Anant Gadgil (born September 18, 1956) is an Indian politician and architect, who has been a member of the Maharashtra Legislative Council  2014 to 2022 He is a member of the Indian National Congress party. Born into the Gadgil gharana of Velneshwar-Wai, Gadgil is the son of Vitthalrao Gadgil and a grandson of Narhar Vishnu Gadgil. He graduated with a Bachelor of Architecture degree from Mumbai University, before going onto finish his Master of Architecture in the United States. He is married and resides in Mumbai.

Literary writing 
Chimajiappa Punekar (Marathi Book)

Pinches & Punches

Award 
Anantrao Gadgil's book Chimajiappa Punekar has won the Maharashtra Sahitya Parishad Award for Humorous Writing.

References 

1956 births
Living people
Marathi people
Indian politicians
Indian architects
Marathi politicians
Politicians from Mumbai